Nine from Little Rock is a 1964 American short documentary film directed by Charles Guggenheim about the Little Rock Nine, the first nine African-American students to attend an all-white Arkansas high school in 1957. The film was commissioned by George Stevens Jr. of the United States Information Agency. The film won Guggenheim his first Oscar at the 37th Academy Awards, held in 1965, for Documentary Short Subject. He was also nominated in the same category the same year for Children Without. The film is narrated by Jefferson Thomas, one of the Little Rock Nine, who died in 2010.

Cast
 Jefferson Thomas as himself – Narrator (also archive footage)
 Ernest Green as himself (also archive footage)
 Thelma Mothershed as herself (also archive footage)

See also
 Civil rights movement in popular culture

References

External links

, posted by the National Archives and Records Administration

1964 films
1964 short films
1964 documentary films
1960s English-language films
1960s short documentary films
American short documentary films
American black-and-white films
Best Documentary Short Subject Academy Award winners
Documentary films about the civil rights movement
Documentary films about Arkansas
Little Rock Nine
Films directed by Charles Guggenheim
United States Information Agency films
1960s American films